Joe Moran is a social and cultural historian who has written about everyday life, especially British everyday life from the mid-twentieth century until the present day.

Moran studied international history and politics at Leeds University before doing an MA in English literature and a DPhil in American studies at Sussex University. The Mass-Observation Archive at Sussex was what aroused his interest in studying the everyday; Moran credits his own interest in taking note of what normally goes unnoticed to the I-Spy booklets he consumed as a young boy.

Quoting Doreen Massey, Moran says that despite every generation's emphasis on change, "much of life for many people 'still consists of waiting in a bus shelter with your shopping for a bus that never comes'"; he describes himself as "trying to find a critical language to talk about these empty, purposeless moments of daily life, filled with activities such as commuting and office routines, that we generally take for granted but that take up so much of our lives." Moran describes himself as influenced by Mass-Observation and a new French ethnography of the quotidian or infraordinary, exemplified by works by Georges Perec, Marc Augé and François Bon.

Moran's book Queuing for Beginners is a chronological account, from breakfast to bed, of a normal British day and how it has changed since the nineteenth century and more particularly since the 1930s; the book received favourable reviews.

As of August 2013, Moran is a Professor of English and Cultural History at Liverpool John Moores University. He has written for The Guardian and New Statesman.

Books by Moran
Star Authors: Literary Celebrity in America. London: Pluto Press, 1999. . (At Google Books.)
Interdisciplinarity. London: Routledge. Hardback: 2001; . Paperback: 2002; . (At Google Books.)
Reading the Everyday. London: Routledge, 2005. Hardback: . Paperback: . (At Google Books.)
Queuing for Beginners: The Story of Daily Life from Breakfast to Bedtime. Hardback. London: Profile Books, 2007. . Paperback. London: Profile Books, 2008. .
On Roads: A Hidden History. Hardback. London: Profile Books, 2009. .
Armchair Nation: An intimate history of Britain in front of the TV. Hardback. London: Profile Books, 2013. .
First You Write a Sentence. The Elements of Reading, Writing … and Life. Penguin. 2018. 

If You Should Fail: A Book of Solace. Hardback. London: Viking Books, 2020.

References

External links
Joe Moran's blog ("On the Everyday, the Banal, and Other Important Matters").
"The Anthropology of Everyday Life." The Book Show. ABC. A talk with Moran as a guest.
"Queuing." Thinking Allowed. BBC. Moran talks with Laurie Taylor.
"November in Berlin: The End of the Everyday." History Workshop Journal 57 (2004) 216-234. An article by Moran.
"Crossing the Road in Britain 1931-1976." The Historical Journal 49 (2006), 477-96.

Living people
Academics of Liverpool John Moores University
Alumni of the University of Leeds
Alumni of the University of Sussex
British sociologists
British historians
British columnists
The Guardian journalists
Year of birth missing (living people)